Cargill railway station was in the Scottish county of Perth and Kinross. The station was opened by the Scottish Midland Junction Railway running between Perth and Arbroath.

History
Opened by the Scottish Midland Junction Railway, which was later absorbed by the Caledonian Railway, it became part of the London, Midland and Scottish Railway during the Grouping of 1923. Passing on to the Scottish Region of British Railways on nationalisation in 1948, it was then closed by the British Transport Commission.

References

Notes

Sources

External links
 

Disused railway stations in Perth and Kinross
Railway stations in Great Britain opened in 1848
Railway stations in Great Britain closed in 1956
Former Caledonian Railway stations